The Kösterbeck is a river near Rostock in the German state of Mecklenburg-Vorpommern. It is a tributary of the Warnow. The little river runs through the nature reserve of the same name in the parish of Roggentin in a part of Rostock Switzerland. This hilly landscape was formed as a terminal moraine in the ice age.

The Kösterbeck is fed from several small runlets, that drain the Teufelsmoor ("Devil's Moor") near Sanitz, and by the Moehlenbäk ca. 1.5 km south of Sanitz. As a result of agricultural use, the Kösterbeck has had its natural course changed. The Kösterbeck is crossed at Kessin by the A 19 motorway and empties, after 1.3 kilometres, into the Warnow.

See also
List of rivers of Mecklenburg-Vorpommern

Rivers of Mecklenburg-Western Pomerania
Rivers of Germany